Mocorón is a remote village in the Puerto Lempira municipality of the Gracias a Dios Department in northeastern Honduras.   It is located near the confluence of the Mocorón River and the Rio Dursuna stream.  The Mocorón Airport is nearby.

In 1981 the village became a refugee camp for Miskito refugees from Nicaragua.Tillman, Benjamin F. Imprints on Native Lands: The Miskito-Moravian Settlement Landscape in Honduras, pp. 57-58 (2011)Chen, Desiree (10 November 1991). Volunteer Finds Her Cause In Jungles of Honduras, Chicago Tribune ("Mocoron, a village of 400 people that is almost completely cut off from the outside world")

References

Gracias a Dios Department